Robert Selden Garnett (December 16, 1819 – July 13, 1861) was a career military officer, serving in the United States Army until the American Civil War, when he became a Confederate States Army brigadier general. He was the first general officer killed in the Civil War.

Early life and career
Garnett, the son of Robert Selden Garnett, Sr., and Charlotte Olympia De Gouges, was born at the family plantation in Essex County, Virginia. Through his mother, he was a great-grandson of French playwright and activist Olympes de Gouges. Along with his cousin, Richard B. Garnett, Robert attended the United States Military Academy in West Point, New York, graduating 27th in a class of 52. Seven classmates, including his cousin, would die in combat in the Civil War.  Another notable cousin of the Garnetts was United States Congressman Robert M. T. Hunter, who went on to become a Senator in the Confederate Congress and Secretary of State of the Confederacy.

Upon his graduation from West Point, Garnett was assigned as a second lieutenant in the 4th U.S. Artillery in July 1841. He spent a year on the Northern Frontier during the Canada Border Disturbances, serving in Buffalo and Fort Ontario in New York before being assigned garrison duty at Fort Monroe in his native Virginia. In 1843 Garnett became an assistant tactics instructor at West Point before becoming an army recruiter and then an Aide-de-camp to General John E. Wool. Garnett served in the Mexican–American War under Zachary Taylor and received two brevets for distinguished service, one at the Battle of Monterrey and the other for "Gallant and Meritorious Conduct" in the Battle of Buena Vista.

In 1848, Garnett transferred to the 7th U.S. Infantry and served in the Seminole Wars in Florida before heading to the Presidio of Monterey, California. In 1849, then Major Garnett designed what would become the Great Seal of California. After a brief stint on a review board in Washington, D.C., he served on the frontier in Texas, being promoted to captain. He returned to West Point as Commandant of Cadets before being transferred to garrison duty in Virginia. Being named a captain in the 1st U.S. Cavalry, he once again served on the frontier. The much traveled Garnett was promoted to major of the 9th U.S. Infantry and went west to the Washington Territory, where he served in the 1856 Yakima Expedition and the 1858 fighting against the Puget Sound Indians. He designed and supervised the construction of Fort Simcoe. He requested and was granted an extended leave of absence later that year, when his wife and young son died from disease and he returned east to bury their remains. Still in mourning, he was traveling in Europe when the Confederate States of America were formed.

Civil War

When Virginia seceded from the United States, Garnett resigned his commission in April 1861 and became Adjutant General of the Virginia troops, serving under Robert E. Lee. In June, he was assigned as brigadier general of the Provisional Army. At the start of the Civil War, Union forces had rapidly crossed the Ohio River to seize a portion of northwestern Virginia (now a part of West Virginia), winning a key victory at the Battle of Philippi. On June 15, Lee assigned Garnett to reorganize the Confederate forces in the area. He deployed his forces at strategic points along the Staunton-Parkersburg Turnpike, hoping to defend the vital supply route against Federal troops. A series of small battles occurred, with the Confederates being forced to withdraw under pressure from Maj. Gen. George B. McClellan's Union forces.

After a defeat at Battle of Rich Mountain, Garnett withdrew from his Laurel Hill entrenchments under cover of darkness, hoping to escape to northern Virginia with his 4,500 men. However, he received what later proved to be false information that his escape route to Beverly was blocked by Union troops. He instead marched to the northeast, following ridges and valleys in a more circuitous route. Pursued for several days by as many as 20,000 Federals, Garnett paused at several stream crossings to slow his adversaries. While directing his rear guard in a delaying action at Corrick's Ford, Garnett was shot and killed during a Union volley. A friend in the Union Army recovered his body after Garnett's remaining men had fled. A participant in the battle related his coming upon the body of Gen. Garnett as he was dying and expressed the belief that he had been killed mistakenly by his own men.

In memoriam

In recognition of Garnett's service during the Mexican–American War, a Federal honor guard conveyed his body under a flag of truce to his relatives, who buried Garnett in Baltimore, Maryland. He was later re-interred next to his wife in Green-Wood Cemetery in Brooklyn, New York, one of two Confederate generals buried there. His grave monument, which he had erected for his wife and child, does not have his name on it.  One face mentions his wife, one face his son, and one face has the words "To My Wife and Child."  The fourth face is blank.

In California, the General Robert S. Garnett Chapter 2570 of the United Daughters of the Confederacy was named in his memory and honor. In 1957, they established a monument to Garnett, who had designed California's State Seal during his brief service at the Presidio in Monterey in 1849. In 2017, after the white supremacist rally in Charlottesville, Virginia, the city of Monterey installed a new plaque omitting mention of Garnett's Confederate history; it was stolen in 2020.
There is a Sons of Confederate Veterans camp in West Virginia named Robert Garnett Camp 1470 in his honor.

See also

 List of American Civil War generals (Confederate)

Notes

References
 Eicher, John H., and David J. Eicher, Civil War High Commands. Stanford: Stanford University Press, 2001. .
 Fout, Frederick W. The Dark Days of the Civil War, 1861 to 1865. St. Louis: F.A. Wagenfuehr, 1904. .
 Sifakis, Stewart. Who Was Who in the Civil War. New York: Facts On File, 1988. .
 Depiction and history of the State Seal of California
 Military biography of Robert S. Garnett from the Cullum biographies
 Warner, Ezra J. Generals in Gray: Lives of the Confederate Commanders. Baton Rouge: Louisiana State University Press, 1959. .

External links

 Robert S. Garnett in Encyclopedia Virginia
 Green-Wood Cemetery Burial Search

1819 births
1861 deaths
Burials at Green-Wood Cemetery
Confederate States Army brigadier generals
American military personnel of the Mexican–American War
People from Essex County, Virginia
Tucker County, West Virginia in the American Civil War
United States Military Academy alumni
Commandants of the Corps of Cadets of the United States Military Academy
People of Virginia in the American Civil War
Confederate States of America military personnel killed in the American Civil War
Garnett family of Virginia